Johannes Floors (born 8 February 1995) is a German Paralympic track and field athlete. A bilateral lower limb amputee, Floors competes in sprint events, competing in the T43 classification. He has won medals at both European and World Championship level and was part of the German Athletics at the 2016 Summer Paralympics – Men's 4 × 100 metres relay team that won gold at the 2016 Summer Paralympics in Rio.

Personal life
Floors was born in Bissendorf, Germany, in 1995. He was born without his right foot and part of his lower shin.

References

External links
 
 

1995 births
Living people
German male sprinters
German amputees
Paralympic athletes of Germany
Paralympic gold medalists for Germany
Paralympic medalists in athletics (track and field)
Athletes (track and field) at the 2016 Summer Paralympics
Athletes (track and field) at the 2020 Summer Paralympics
Medalists at the 2016 Summer Paralympics
World Para Athletics Championships winners